PS Cheshire was a passenger vessel built for the Town Council of Birkenhead in 1889 for use as a Mersey ferry.

History

She was built in Canada Works, Birkenhead in 1889 for the Town Council of Birkenhead for use as a Mersey Ferry. There was some dispute with the builder as she was refused by the commissioners, and was put up for sale, but the highest bid of £4,500 (equivalent to £ in ) did not meet the reserve price, so she was withdrawn.

In 1903 she was put up for sale by the Birkenhead Corporation and eventually she was sold to the Great Western Railway who deployed her as a tender in Plymouth.

On 9 December 1905 she was in collision with the Maggie Hough of Liverpool in dense fog in Plymouth sound. The Cheshire had just taken on board from the American liner  47 passengers and mail bags, and did not see the Maggie Hough which was anchoring in the channel for the fog to lift.

She was broken up in Germany in October 1911.

References

1889 ships
Passenger ships of the United Kingdom
Paddle steamers of the United Kingdom
Steamships of the United Kingdom
Ships built on the River Mersey
Ships of the Great Western Railway